Helen Longworth (born 11 December 1976 in Preston, Lancashire) is a British actress.

She has appeared in many radio plays including playing the character of Zofia in six series of On Mardle Fen, Susie Dean in The Good Companions and Marina in Pericles. Also in A Song For Edmond Shakespeare (2005) and The Pattern of Painful Adventures (2008), both fictional treatments of the life of William Shakespeare.

Her TV appearances include Hollyoaks, Heartbeat, Emmerdale, "Coronation Street" and "Doctors".

Longworth has appeared as a lead vocalist with rock band Heroes of She.

She previously played the recurring character of Hannah Riley, an agricultural student who worked with pigs, in the radio show, The Archers, aired on BBC Radio 4. She returned to the role, now as the deputy manager of a pig unit, in mid 2018.

Radio

References

External links

Helen Longworth Radio listing
RADA listing
Heroes of She

1976 births
Alumni of RADA
English radio actresses
English television actresses
English voice actresses
Living people
Actors from Preston, Lancashire